Fogo (Portuguese for "fire") is an island in the Sotavento group of Cape Verde. Its population is 35,837 (2015), with an area of 476 km2.

History
The eastern side of Fogo collapsed into the ocean 73,000 years ago, creating a tsunami 170 meters high which struck the nearby island of Santiago.

Fogo was discovered in 1460 by Genovese captain António de Noli on behalf of Henry the Navigator and the Portuguese Crown. It appeared in a 1598 map as I. de Fogo. Fogo was the second island of Cape Verde that was settled by the Portuguese, between 1470 and 1490, making São Filipe the second oldest town of Cape Verde after Cidade Velha.

The Fogo volcano erupted frequently, both from the summit and from flank fissures, notably in 1680, 1725, 1857, 1951, 1995, and 2014–15. The eruption of 1680 covered much of the island in ash, which forced many inhabitants to flee to the nearby island of Brava.

Fogo has been very susceptible to drought and famine. In years that the rains during the summer months were  insufficient, many inhabitants were menaced by starvation. This occurred several times in the 18th and 19th century, and also between 1941 and 1943, when 31% of the island population perished.

Until January 1992 the island was one single municipality, subdivided into four parishes. The southwestern three parishes joined the new municipality of São Filipe and the northeastern parish Nossa Senhora da Ajuda became the municipality of Mosteiros. The parish of Santa Catarina do Fogo was separated from São Filipe in 2005, and became the Municipality of Santa Catarina do Fogo.

Geography
One of the southernmost islands in Cape Verde, Fogo is located between the islands of Santiago to the east and Brava to the west. It is 26.3 km long and 23.9 km wide; its area is 476 km2. Practically the whole island is a stratovolcano that has been periodically active: it last erupted in 2014. Two small villages, Portela and Bangaeira, exist in the floor of the caldera (Chã das Caldeiras); the residents were evacuated during eruptions.

The island's main city is São Filipe, near which are an airport and a port. Fogo is largely an agricultural, fertile  island. The north-eastern part receives the most precipitation.

Flora and fauna 

Key bird species of Fogo are Fea's petrel, Boyd's shearwater and Cape Verde swift. The endemic plants Echium vulcanorum (endangered) and Erysimum caboverdeanum (critically endangered) are only found on the outer crater rim of the volcano of Fogo.

Climate
Being very mountainous, Fogo has quite a number of climates.

There can be remarkably cool weather in the interior, with the warmer wet season starting in July and ending in November, with the colder dry season starting in December and ending in May. Drought, the major climate risk of Cape Verdean islands, is much less pronounced on Fogo, due to the mountain's ability to gain moisture from clouds. During the mid-nineteenth century, Fogo suffered from severe droughts. Death from starvation was common in the 1830s.

Population
In the 1830s, Fogo had an estimated human population of 10,000. In 2015, Fogo had 35,837 inhabitants, making it the fourth most populous island in the Cape Verde archipelago after Santiago, São Vicente and Santo Antão. Since 2015, there are three cities (São Filipe, Mosteiros and Cova Figueira) and two towns (Ponta Verde and Patim) in the island.

The official language of Fogo is Portuguese; yet mostly Fogo Creole is spoken.

Economy
The economy of the island is based on agriculture and fishing, with coffee and wine among the main products. In the 1830s, Fogo's wine was described as being "very superior."  Due to its volcanic soil Fogo's coffee also has a good reputation. The island has experienced a substantial diaspora. Many households live off remittances from emigrants in the U.S. and in European countries (Portugal, France, the Netherlands, Italy). Fogo fosters strong connections to Rhode Island and to Massachusetts (U.S.), where many people with Cape Verdean origin live.

Tourism is steadily becoming popular. The volcano (allowed only accompanied by a local guide) is the island's major attraction but many visitors also come to see relatives. The historic city of São Filipe and Chã das Caldeiras in the volcanic crater receive the bulk of visitors. No great tourism facilities exist, but there are small hotels and bed-and-breakfasts and local guides offer hiking tours.

Administrative divisions
The island is divided in three municipalities, which are subdivided into civil parishes:
Mosteiros
Nossa Senhora da Ajuda
Santa Catarina do Fogo
Santa Catarina do Fogo
São Filipe
Nossa Senhora da Conceição
São Lourenço

Transportation
The island has a domestic airport, São Filipe Airport, located in the southwest of the island. There is a port at Vale de Cavaleiros near São Filipe, with ferry connections to the islands of Brava (Furna) and Santiago (Praia). There are two first class national roads on Fogo: the Fogo Circular Road (EN1-FG01) and the road linking São Filipe and the island's port (EN1-FG02).

Sports

The main football teams are Académica do Fogo, Botafogo, Cutelinho, Spartak d'Aguadinha and Vulcânicos.

Notable people
 Pedro Cardoso, poet
 Zé Luís, footballer
 Pedro Pires, first Prime Minister and 3rd President of Cape Verde
 Henrique Teixeira de Sousa, writer
 Carlos de Vasconcelos, politician and journalist

Gallery

References

External links

Informations and impressions from Fogo
Caboverde.com
University of Massachusetts – information and images from Fogo
Fogo people picture

 
Islands of Cape Verde